William Jeremiah "Lord" Byron (September 18, 1872 – December 27, 1955) was an American Major League Baseball umpire. Byron was known as the "Singing Umpire", because he would occasionally sing his calls.

Byron made his major league umpiring debut on April 10,  for the National League. He would work in the NL from  until , umpiring 1,012 games and the 1914 World Series with Bill Dinneen, Bill Klem, and George Hildebrand.

Byron died in Ypsilanti, Michigan.

See also 

 List of Major League Baseball umpires

References

1872 births
1955 deaths
Major League Baseball umpires
Sportspeople from New York City